Townshend Packet (Townsend Packet) was launched at Falmouth in 1800 as a packet for the Post Office Packet Service. She made numerous voyages between Falmouth and Lisbon and also sailed to the West Indies, Brazil, and the Mediterranean. She had two engagements with American privateers. In the first the Americans captured her, but then released her. In the second she repelled her attacker. A French frigate captured her in 1814 and then sank her.

Career
Lloyd's Register (LR) only started carrying Falmouth packets in 1813. She was listed as having been built at Falmouth in 1800.

Richard Dodd was appointed her master on 26 April 1800. In September 1806 it was reported that Townshend Packet, Dodd, master, had been captured by a French privateer off the Isle of Scilly. She sailed from Lisbon for Falmouth on 7 October and arrived on 16 October.

Roger P. Western was appointed master of Townshend Packet on 24 February 1809.

Townshend Packet was driven from her moorings and onto the ashore at Falmouth on 24 January 1809 but it was expected that she would be gotten off.

At some point between 1809 and 1811 Townshend Packet stopped at Cagliari, Sardinia. She had as passengers to Malta Lord Byron and his companion John Cam Hobhouse.

On 22 November 1812 Townshend Packet, Cock, master, was a few miles short of arriving at Barbados when she encountered two American privateer schooners, Tom, Captain Tom Wilson, and Bona, Captain John Dameron. Though greatly outgunned, Cock resisted.

In the table below, "K" indicates data from Kert; N indicates data from Norway.

The battle commended at 7:30am with the American fire destroying Townshend Pakets rigging and holing her so that water started to accumulate in her hold. She repelled several attempts by the Americans to board, despite their greatly superior numbers. Finally at about 10am, Cock struck. Her master had been killed and 10 men were wounded, some severely. The Americans took possession of her with Captain Wilson giving Captain Cock a note attesting to his fierce resistance and giving the number of men and armament reported in Norway. Townshend Packet was sinking and the Americans proposed to put Cock into her boats to send the ashore while the Americans set fire to the prize. Cock protested that the boats too were in damaged states and that with many of his men wounded, the boats might well not reach shore. The Americans accepted a bill of exchange for £1200, plundered Townshend Packet, and turned her over to Cock and his men. Cock and his unwounded men repaired her sufficiently to be able to sail her into Barbados at 7pm.

Townshend Packet underwent sufficient repairs to render her seaworthy. She sailed from Barbados early in January 1813. On 18 January she encountered another American privateer schooner. At 3pm the American fired on Townshend Packet and gave chase. Cock fired his 9-pounder stern chasers. At 3:30 he succeeded in bringing down his pursuer's foreyard. Seeing confusion on the pursuer's deck, Cock yawed and fired a broadside that did further damage to his pursuers rigging. Cock then set off again while firing his stern guns. At 4pm the American schooner fell behind and a squall at 4:15pm separated the vessels, enabling Townshend Packet to escape.

Fate
Townshend Packet sailed from Rio de Janeiro on 19 December 1813, bound for Falmouth. Although Captain Denis Lagarde flew Portuguese colours in an attempt to trick Cock, Cock surmised that the frigate was French, not Portuguese, and threw his mails overboard before the Frenchmen boarded Townshend Packet. While the French were plundering her, two sails appeared in the distance. The French cut their activities short and sank her.

Clorinde took Cock and his crew on board and they were present, below deck, during the battle on 25 February when  captured Clorinde. Cock died a few months later. Shortly before Cock's death, the Prince Regent of Portugal presented Cock with a gold medal of honour and the Military Order of the Sword for Cock's services carrying mail between Lisbon and Falmouth.

Notes

Citations

References
 
 
 

1800 ships
Age of Sail merchant ships of England
Packet (sea transport)
Falmouth Packets
Maritime incidents in 1809
Captured ships